The women's shot put event at the 1994 Commonwealth Games was held at the Centennial Stadium in Victoria, British Columbia.

Results

References

Shot
1994
1994 in women's athletics